Gimouille is a commune in the Nièvre department in central France.

Demographics

See also
Communes of the Nièvre department

References

Communes of Nièvre